Thomas "Thom" Gossom Jr. (born May 2, 1952) is an American actor.

Gossom played college football for the Auburn Tigers. He was a cast member of the TV series In the Heat of the Night. He has appeared in multiple movies, including the 2003 sequel Jeepers Creepers 2, as well as guest roles in CSI and other TV shows. He portrayed Slim's father in Queen & Slim.

Filmography

References

External links
 

1952 births
Auburn Tigers football players
Living people
American male television actors
American male film actors
20th-century American male actors